Trichomagdalis is a genus of wedge-shaped bark weevils in the beetle family Curculionidae. There are about six described species in Trichomagdalis.

Species
These six species belong to the genus Trichomagdalis:
 Trichomagdalis atrata Fall, 1913
 Trichomagdalis atratus Fall, 1913
 Trichomagdalis conspersa Fall, 1913
 Trichomagdalis conspersus Fall, 1913
 Trichomagdalis fasciata Fall, 1913
 Trichomagdalis fasciatus Fall, 1913

References

Further reading

 
 
 

Curculionidae
Articles created by Qbugbot